Fondo is a comune (municipality) in Trentino in the northern Italian region Trentino-Alto Adige/Südtirol, located about  north of Trento, precisely at the northern limit of the Val di Non.  
Fondo borders the following municipalities: Brez, Castelfondo, Malosco, Ronzone, Sarnonico, Eppan and Unsere Liebe Frau im Walde-St. Felix.

References

External links
Official website 

Cities and towns in Trentino-Alto Adige/Südtirol
Nonsberg Group